Keylimepie is a genus of braconid wasps in the family Braconidae. There are at least four described species in Keylimepie.

Species
These four species belong to the genus Keylimepie:
 Keylimepie hadhramautensis van Achterberg & Fernández-Triana, 2017 (Yemen)
 Keylimepie peckorum Fernández-Triana, 2016 (Florida)
 Keylimepie sanaaensis van Achterberg & Fernández-Triana, 2017 (Yemen)
 Keylimepie striatus (Muesebeck, 1922) (North America)

References

Further reading

 
 
 

Microgastrinae